Charles Dias de Oliveira (born 4 April 1984), known simply as Charles, is a Brazilian professional footballer who plays for Spanish club Pontevedra CF as a striker.

He spent most of his career in Spain, representing clubs in La Liga, Segunda División and Segunda División B after starting out at Pontevedra.

Club career
Born in Belém, Pará, Charles started playing football with Santos FC where he arrived at the age of four, then completed his development with Tuna Luso Brasileira still in his country and C.D. Feirense in Portugal. He started his senior career with the latter club, competing in both the second and third divisions.

In the summer of 2004, Charles moved to Spain, signing with Pontevedra CF in Segunda División. He made his league debut on 28 August in a 0–1 home loss against Polideportivo Ejido, being sent off after only three minutes on the pitch.

Charles spent the following five seasons with the Galicians in Segunda División B. In his last he led them to the promotion playoffs after scoring 15 goals in the regular season, but it eventually fell short.

In early July 2010, Charles signed as a free agent for Córdoba CF in the second tier. He again netted 15 times in his first campaign, notably grabbing braces in wins against Xerez CD (3–1 away) and Albacete Balompié (5–1, home).

Charles joined UD Almería – also in Andalusia – for the 2012–13 season, after engaging in extensive and fruitless conversations with Córdoba to renew his contract. On 2 December 2012 he scored a hat-trick past Racing de Santander in a 4–3 away win and, already fully reconverted as a striker after having started his career as a winger, was crowned the competition's Pichichi Trophy at 27 goals (plus five in the playoffs) to help his team back to La Liga after two years.

On 27 June 2013, Charles penned a four-year contract with RC Celta de Vigo, as a replacement for Liverpool-bound Iago Aspas. He scored in his top-flight debut at the age of 29, helping to a 2–2 home draw against RCD Espanyol.

Charles was the author of the first-ever goal at the new San Mamés Stadium on 16 September 2013, but in a 3–2 loss to Athletic Bilbao. He took his league tally to seven on 11 January of the following year, netting a brace to help the hosts come from behind and defeat Valencia CF 2–1.

Charles scored both goals in a 2–0 home victory over Real Madrid on 11 May 2014, which ended his opponents chances of winning the league. On 24 June of the following year, he signed a two-year deal with fellow league side Málaga CF.

On 3 October 2015, in matchday seven, Charles netted all of his team's goals – also their first of the new season – to help defeat Real Sociedad 3–1 at the La Rosaleda Stadium. On 4 July 2017 he joined SD Eibar also from the top division, agreeing to a one-year contract as a free agent.

On 31 July 2020, the 36-year-old Charles returned to Pontevedra.

Personal life
Charles is cousin to two other footballers, Igor de Souza and Yuri de Souza. They too were forwards and also spent several seasons in Portugal and Spain, also representing Pontevedra.

Career statistics

Club

Honours
Feirense
Segunda Divisão: 2002–03

Individual
Pichichi Trophy (Segunda División): 2012–13

References

External links

1984 births
Living people
Sportspeople from Belém
Brazilian footballers
Association football forwards
Liga Portugal 2 players
Segunda Divisão players
C.D. Feirense players
La Liga players
Segunda División players
Segunda División B players
Primera Federación players
Segunda Federación players
Pontevedra CF footballers
Córdoba CF players
UD Almería players
RC Celta de Vigo players
Málaga CF players
SD Eibar footballers
Brazilian expatriate footballers
Expatriate footballers in Portugal
Expatriate footballers in Spain
Brazilian expatriate sportspeople in Portugal
Brazilian expatriate sportspeople in Spain